Lee Jin-yong (Hangul: 이진용, born September 9, 1987), better known by his stage name Loopy (Hangul: 루피), is a South Korean rapper.

Discography

Studio albums

Extended plays

Charted singles

References

1987 births
Living people
South Korean male rappers
South Korean hip hop singers
21st-century South Korean male singers